Walter H. Young (born August 15, 1902) was an American college football and basketball coach. He served as the head football and basketball coach at American University in Washington, D.C. from 1929 to 1936.

References

1902 births
Year of death missing
American Eagles athletic directors
American Eagles football coaches
American Eagles men's basketball coaches
Maryland Terrapins football players
Basketball coaches from Washington, D.C.
Players of American football from Washington, D.C.
Coaches of American football from Washington, D.C.